Basohli (formerly Vishwasthali) is a town near Kathua in Kathua district in the union territory of Jammu and Kashmir, India. It is situated on the right bank of River Ravi at an altitude of 1876 ft. It was founded by Raja Bhupat Pal sometime in 1635. It was known for the palaces which are now in ruins and miniatures paintings (Basohli school of Pahari painting). The Battle of Basoli was fought in this region.

Geography
It has an average elevation of 460 metres (1509 feet). Basohli is situated in the uneven lofty hills of Shiwaliks. It is situated in the right bank of Ravi river. Basohli's Thein dam has made it almost landlocked.

Demographics 
According to 2011 census, Basohli had a population of 5433. Males constituted 52.01% of the population and females 47.99%. Basohli had an average literacy rate of 77%, higher than the national average of 59.5%; with 57% of the males and 43% of females literate. 12% of the population was under 6 years of age.

Religion
The religious distribution of the population is as follows - Hindu 83.01%, Muslim 16.38%, other 0.61%.

Basohli painting 
Basohli is widely known for its paintings, which are considered the first school of Pahari paintings, and which evolved into the much prolific Kangra paintings school by mid-eighteenth century.  The painter Nainsukh ended his career in Basohli.

Basohli painting was a vigorous, bold and imaginative artistic style, rich, stylish and unconventional. A style of painting characterized by vigorous use of primary colours and a peculiar facial formula prevailed in the seventeenth and early eighteenth centuries in the foothills of the Western Himalayas in the Jammu and Punjab States. The earliest paintings in this style have been dated to the time of Raja Kirpal Pal (1678–93).

Originating in Basohli State, the style spread to the Hill States of Mankot, Nurpur, Kulu, Mandi, Suket, Bilaspur, Nalagarh, Chamba, Guler and Kangra. The first mention of Basohli painting is in the annual report of the Archaeological Survey of India for the year published in 1921. Referring to the acquisitions of the Archaeological Section of the Central Museum, Lahore, the report states that "a series of old paintings of the Basohli School were purchased, and the Curator concludes that the Basohli Schools is possibly of pre-Moghul origin, and so called Tibeti pictures are nothing but late productions of this school".

History
The Battle of Basoli was fought in Basohli between the Sikhs and the Mughal Empire aided by the Rajputs of the hill states in 1702.

See also
 Battle of Basoli

References

Further reading 
 Hutchinson, J. & J. PH Vogel (1933). History of the Panjab Hill States, Vol. I. 1st edition: Govt. Printing, Pujab, Lahore, 1933. Reprint 2000. Department of Language and Culture, Himachal Pradesh. Chapter XVIII   Basohli State, pp. 587–613.
 (see index: p. 148-152, for information about Basholi painting)

Cities and towns in Kathua district
Indian painting